No.5 (stylized as №5) is the fifth Korean studio album (ninth overall) by South Korean boy band 2PM. The album was released in both physical and digital format on June 15, 2015, by JYP Entertainment.

Background and release
On May 8, 2015, JYP Entertainment announced that the group will be releasing their fifth album on June 1 and will be followed with two concerts to be held at Olympic Gymnastics Arena in Seoul, South Korea later that month. On May 11, 2015, the group's label explained that the album would be pushed backed to mid-June after video production company, Dextor Lab, pulled out of the production for the group's music video and would take legal action for the delay. On May 13, JYP said that they would be working with Naive Creative Productions for the music video. The album's track list was revealed on June 10, 2015. The album along with title track's music video was subsequently released on June 15, 2015 in South Korea.

Composition
The album's lead track, "My House", is a dance song and was written and composed by member Jun. K, who previously wrote and composed "Go Crazy" on their last Korean release. Other group members also participated in the production of the album.

Commercial performance
No.5 debuted at number one on the Gaon Album Chart for the week of June 14, 2015. As of 2015, the album had sold 62,618 copies in South Korea. In Japan, the album debuted at number fourteen on the Oricon Albums Chart, selling 6,307 copies in its first week. By the end of June, No.5 had sold 9,132 copies. In the United States, the album debuted at number three on the Billboard World Albums chart.

Track listing

Notes
 Taecyeon is also credited for writing and producing the song's rap.

Charts

Release history

References

2015 albums
2PM albums
JYP Entertainment albums
Korean-language albums